William Atuguba is a former justice of the Supreme Court of Ghana.

Career

Atuguba was first enrolled as a magistrate on 3 October 1974. He has worked as a private lawyer and served as a prosecutor and state attorney before being appointed a Supreme Court Judge by President Rawlings in 1995. He was the acting Chief Justice from May 25, 2016, until June 3, 2016, while Justice Georgina Theodora Woode was outside the country on official duties. He was for a period, the most senior judge in the Supreme Court. He acted as Chief Justice from February 2017 prior to the retirement of Georgina Theodora Wood on 8 June 2017 until 19 June 2017 when Sophia Akuffo was sworn in by President Akufo-Addo as the new Chief Justice.

He has been one of the longest serving members of the Supreme Court of Ghana. He was a judge for 44 years and a Supreme Court judge from 1995 to 2018, a total of almost 23 years.

See also
List of judges of the Supreme Court of Ghana
Supreme Court of Ghana

References

Year of birth missing (living people)
Living people
Justices of the Supreme Court of Ghana
Place of birth missing (living people)
Tamale Senior High School alumni